Khosrow Shirin (also Romanized as Khosrow Shīrīn; also known as Kūh-i-Khusru and Shirin) is a village in Khosrow Shirin Rural District, formerly in the Central District of Eqlid County, Fars Province, Iran. At the 2006 census, its population was 1,835, in 503 families.

References 

Populated places in Eqlid County